Italy competed at the FIS Alpine World Ski Championships 2019 in Åre, Sweden, from 4 to 17 February 2019.

Medalists

Results

Men

Women

See also
 Italy at the FIS Alpine World Ski Championships
 Italy national alpine ski team

References

External links
 Åre 2019 at International Ski Federation
 Italian Winter Sports Federation 

Nations at the FIS Alpine World Ski Championships 2019
Alpine World Ski Championships
Italy at the FIS Alpine World Ski Championships